The Primera División (women) Golden Boot also known as the Pichichi is an annual football (soccer) award presented to the leading goalscorer in Spain's Primera División (women).

The Primera División was established in 1988 as the top tier of women's football in Spain. The award is given to the top-scorer each season. 

Jennifer Hermoso has won the award a record 5 times. Mexico's Charlyn Corral was the first not of Spanish nationality to have won the award.

Winners

See also
 List of sports awards honoring women
Copa de la Reina de Fútbol
Supercopa de España Femenina

References

External links
Official website 

Spanish football trophies and awards
Spain women
Women's association football trophies and awards